Michelle Uhrig (born 20 January 1996) is a German speed skater. She competed in the women's 1000 metres at the 2018 Winter Olympics. In November 2019, she became the German national champion 1000 metres, and 1500 metres.

References

External links
 

1996 births
Living people
German female speed skaters
Olympic speed skaters of Germany
Speed skaters at the 2018 Winter Olympics
Speed skaters at the 2022 Winter Olympics
Place of birth missing (living people)
Speed skaters at the 2012 Winter Youth Olympics
21st-century German women